Yangyang County (Yangyang-gun) is in Gangwon Province, South Korea.  The county is located in the northeast of the country in Gangwon-do. Its population is about 31,000 (2004).

The Yangyang area is well known for its pine mushrooms (song-i), its fish—particularly salmon—and its sunrises.

Overview
In 2002, Yangyang opened its own airport, serving Gangneung to the south and Sokcho to the north. It was intended for the many tourists attracted by the Seorak-san national park. The airport was closed in 2009 due to a lack of passengers, but reopened a year later.

The county is proud to unite the five major religions of Korea: Confucianism, Buddhism, Shamanism, Protestantism and Roman Catholicism. There are sites for all these faiths in Yangyang. Seonghwangsa is a shamanistic altar which was traditionally used for sacrificial rites. Yangyang Hyanggyo is a Confucian school built in 1340. Today the school mainly serves as a shrine, but classes are still held there. In 1921, Yangyang Cathedral was built. During the Korean War it was burnt to the ground but rebuilt afterwards.

The county is also proud of its five-day market. It is the largest traditional market in the area and renowned for the quality of its produce. The market is held on days ending in 4 and 9.

Tourism
Naksansa(洛山寺)
Uisangdae(義湘台)
Junjisaji pagoda(陳田寺址三層石塔)
Naksan Beach
Osan Beach
Dongho Beach
Hajodae Beach
Ingu Beach
Jigyeong Beache

Climate

References

External links
Yangyang County government English-language home page

 
Counties of Gangwon Province, South Korea